Ana Starovoitova is a Lithuanian female boxer and 2022 IBA lightweight bronze medallist at European championships. She is also an active boxing coach in Klaipėda boxing club Bokso Visata.

Biography 
At the 2022 IBA Women's World Boxing Championships Starovoitova lost her first match with Kiria Tapia of Puerto Rico.

At the 2022 Women's European Amateur Boxing Championships Starovoitova competed in the lightweight division. In the semifinal she lost to Czech Lenka Bernardova and was awarded bronze medal.

During 2022 Ukrainian refugee crisis, Starovoitova with her husband started a free boxing school for Ukrainian refugee children.

References

External links 
 

Living people
Sportspeople from Vilnius
Lithuanian women boxers
Lightweight boxers
Boxing trainers
Year of birth missing (living people)
21st-century Lithuanian women